HMS Bagshot was a Hunt-class minesweeper of the Aberdare sub-class built for the Royal Navy during World War I. She was not completed in time to participate in the First World War and survived the Second World War to be sold for scrap in 1947.

Design and description
The Aberdare sub-class were enlarged versions of the original Hunt-class ships with a more powerful armament. The ships displaced  at normal load. The ships' complement consisted of 74 officers and ratings.

The ships had two vertical triple-expansion steam engines, each driving one shaft, using steam provided by two Yarrow boilers.

The Aberdare sub-class was armed with a quick-firing (QF)  gun forward of the bridge and a QF twelve-pounder (76.2 mm) anti-aircraft gun aft. Some ships were fitted with six- or three-pounder guns in lieu of the twelve-pounder.

Construction and career
HMS Bagshot was built by the Ardrossan Dry Dock & Shipbuilding Company and was launched on 23 May 1918. She temporarily became depot ship Medway II 1 April 1945 to 28 February 1946.

See also
 Bagshot, Surrey

Notes

References
 
 
 

 

Hunt-class minesweepers (1916)
Royal Navy ship names
Shipwrecks in the Mediterranean Sea
Ships sunk by mines
1918 ships
Maritime incidents in 1951